USS Samuel B. Roberts may refer to the following ships of the United States Navy: 

, was an  guided missile frigate, commissioned in 1986 and decommissioned in 2015.

See also

United States Navy ship names